Antonio Alfano is an American football defensive tackle. He attended Colonia High School and committed to the University of Alabama on May 18, 2018. On November 4, 2019, Alfano transferred from Alabama to the University of Colorado.  On May 29, 2020 it was reported that he was no longer a member of the Colorado football team.  As of August 19, 2020 Alfano was reinstated to the football team.

High school career 
Raised in Rahway, New Jersey, Alfano attended the local public schools through eighth grade before enrolling at Bergen Catholic High School. He transferred to Rahway High School in his hometown, before moving from Rahway to the Avenel section of Woodbridge Township, New Jersey and transferring to Colonia High School in New Jersey. As a senior, Alfano was a 5-star recruit and the fifth-ranked overall player in the class of 2019, and was named to the All-American team by MaxPreps. He received scholarship offers from Alabama, Notre Dame, Florida State, Florida, LSU, USC, Miami, Ohio State, Penn State, Rutgers and others.

College career

As a freshman at Alabama, Alfano was absent from class and practices in September for unspecified reasons, though Alfano's father tweeted that his absence may have stemmed from Alfano's grandmother, who had been in ill-health at the time. Alfano entered the NCAA transfer portal on September 13, 2019 and Colorado Buffaloes head coach (and former Alabama Crimson Tide defensive backs coach) Mel Tucker announced that Alfano had transferred to Colorado on November 4, 2019. Alabama head coach Nick Saban addressed Alfano's time with the team by saying Alfano, "basically quit." He did not play any games for the Crimson Tide.

Buffaloes head coach Mel Tucker had previously recruited Alfano to Georgia, where Tucker was the Defensive Coordinator at the time. One month after Alfano officially enrolled at Colorado, Buffaloes head coach Mel Tucker left the program to take the same position at Michigan State University, while Alfano's position coach at Colorado, Jimmy Brumbaugh, also left the program the same week to take a coaching job at the University of Tennessee.  On May 29, 2020, it was reported that Alfano was no longer enrolled at Colorado and no longer a member of the football team. As of August 19, 2020 Alfano was reinstated to the football team.

References

External links
247sports.com bio

Living people
Colonia High School alumni
Players of American football from New Jersey
American football defensive tackles
Alabama Crimson Tide football players
Colorado Buffaloes football players
Bergen Catholic High School alumni
Sportspeople from Rahway, New Jersey
People from Woodbridge Township, New Jersey
Rahway High School alumni
Sportspeople from Union County, New Jersey
2000 births